Kate Box is an Australian stage, film and television actress. She is known for her roles as Nicole Vargas in Rake and as Lou Kelly in Wentworth.

Career
In 2003, Box graduated from the National Institute of Dramatic Art (NIDA) Her first stage performance was in 2004 as Helena in A Midsummer Night's Dream at the Bell Shakespeare Company, while her other credits include the Sydney Theatre Company presentation of Top Girls which she received a Helpmann Award for Best Female Actor in a Supporting Role in a Play nomination, Dolores (Old Fitzroy Theatre), Macbeth (Sydney Theatre Company) and A Christmas Carol (Belvoir).

She went on to make her screen debut with a role in the 2005 television film sequel Small Claims: White Wedding. Following this, she made her film debut in 2008 with The Black Balloon and she received guest spots on television shows such as the medical drama series All Saints and the children's drama series My Place. She came to prominence with her role as Nicole Vargas in the ABC comedy-drama series Rake for which she appeared throughout its entire run. During her run on Rake, Box was cast in popular television series including Offspring, Old School and the six-part mini-series Fucking Adelaide.

In 2014, Box was nominated for an AACTA Award for Best Actress in a Leading Role for her performance in The Little Death.

Box played Marg McMann in the 2018 television film Riot, a film focusing on the LGBTI rights movement and the origins of the Sydney Gay and Lesbian Mardi Gras in the 1970s, a role of which won her the AACTA Award for Best Lead Actress in a Television Drama.

Her subsequent acting credits have included roles in the 2018 mini-series adaptation of Picnic at Hanging Rock, Wanted, The Unlisted and Les Norton, and the feature films The Daughter, Three Summers and Back of the Net.

In 2019, it was announced Box was cast in the role of Lou Kelly in the Foxtel prison drama series Wentworth for its eighth and final season. Also in 2019, Box was announced as a cast member in the Cate Blanchett-produced Matchbox Pictures series, Stateless.

In February 2022 it was announced that Box would be play a leading role in the "Tasmanian noir crime comedy" TV series, Deadloch, written by Kate McCartney and Kate McLennan. The eight-part series by Australian Amazon Original will be released in 2023.

Personal life
Since 2009, Box has been in a relationship with writer and actor Jada Alberts, who also appeared in Wentworth from 2013 to 2014. Now married, they reside in Sydney with their three children.

Filmography

Film

Television

Awards and nominations

Notes

References

External links

Kate Box on Instagram

1970s births
Living people
AACTA Award winners
Australian film actresses
Australian stage actresses
Australian television actresses
Year of birth missing (living people)
Actresses from Adelaide
21st-century Australian actresses
National Institute of Dramatic Art alumni
Australian LGBT actors
LGBT actresses